Walter Heinrich Heitler (2 January 1904 – 15 November 1981) was a German physicist who made contributions to quantum electrodynamics and quantum field theory.  He brought chemistry under quantum mechanics through his theory of valence bonding.

Education

In 1922, Heitler began his study of physics at the Karlsruhe Technische Hochschule, in 1923 at the Humboldt University of Berlin, and in 1924 at the Ludwig Maximilian University of Munich (LMU), where he studied under both Arnold Sommerfeld and Karl Herzfeld.  The latter was his thesis advisor when he obtained his doctorate in 1926; Herzfeld taught courses in theoretical physics and one in physical chemistry, and in Sommerfeld's absence often took over his classes. From 1926 to 1927, he was a Rockefeller Foundation Fellow for postgraduate research with Niels Bohr at the Institute for Theoretical Physics at the University of Copenhagen and with Erwin Schrödinger at the University of Zurich.  He then became an assistant to Max Born at the Institute for Theoretical Physics at the University of Göttingen.  Heitler completed his Habilitation, under Born, in 1929, and then remained as a Privatdozent until 1933. In that year, he was let go by the university because he was Jewish.

At the time Heitler received his doctorate, three Institutes for Theoretical Physics formed a consortium which worked on the key problems of the day, such as atomic and molecular structure, and exchanged both scientific information and personnel in their scientific quests.  These institutes were located at the LMU, under Arnold Sommerfeld, the University of Göttingen, under Max Born, and the University of Copenhagen, under Niels Bohr.  Furthermore, Werner Heisenberg and Born had just recently published their trilogy of papers which launched the matrix mechanics formulation of quantum mechanics. Also, in early 1926, Erwin Schrödinger, at the University of Zurich, began to publish his quintet of papers which launched the wave mechanics formulation of quantum mechanics and showed that the wave mechanics and matrix mechanics formulations were equivalent. These papers immediately put the personnel at the leading theoretical physics institutes onto applying these new tools to understanding atomic and molecular structure.  It was in this environment that Heitler went on his Rockefeller Foundations Fellowship, leaving LMU and within a period of two years going to do research and study with the leading figures of the day in theoretical physics, Bohr's personnel in Copenhagen, Schrödinger in Zurich, and Born in Göttingen.

In Zurich, with Fritz London, Heitler applied the new quantum mechanics to deal with the saturable, nondynamic forces of attraction and repulsion, i.e., exchange forces, of the hydrogen molecule.  Their valence bond treatment of this problem, was a landmark in that it brought chemistry under quantum mechanics.  Furthermore, their work greatly influenced chemistry through Linus Pauling, who had just received his doctorate and on a Guggenheim Fellowship visited Heitler and London in Zurich. Pauling spent much of his career studying the nature of the chemical bond. The application of quantum mechanics to chemistry would be a prominent theme in Heitler's career.

While Heitler was at Göttingen, Adolf Hitler came to power in 1933.  With the rising prominence of anti-Semitism under Hitler, Born took it upon himself to take the younger Jewish generation under his wing. In doing so, Born arranged for Heitler to get a position that year as a Research Fellow at the University of Bristol, with Nevill Francis Mott.

Career
At Bristol, Heitler was a Research Fellow of the Academic Assistance Council, in the H. H. Wills Physics Laboratory.  At Bristol, among other things, he worked on quantum field theory and quantum electrodynamics on his own, as well as in collaboration with other scientific refugees from Hitler, such as Hans Bethe and Herbert Fröhlich, who also left Germany in 1933.

With Bethe, he published a paper on pair production of gamma rays in the Coulomb field of an atomic nucleus, in which they developed the Bethe-Heitler formula for Bremsstrahlung. 

In 1936, Heitler published his major work on quantum electrodynamics, The Quantum Theory of Radiation, which marked the direction for future developments in quantum theory. The book appeared in many editions and printings and has been translated into Russian.

Heitler also contributed to the understanding of cosmic rays,
as well as predicted the existence of the electrically neutral pi meson. 
While developing the theory of cosmic ray showers in 1937, he became aware of the latest experimental work in the field: the observation of cosmic ray interactions in Nuclear emulsion by Austrian physicists Marietta Blau and Hertha Wambacher. He mentioned this to Bristol colleague Cecil Powell, saying that the method appeared so straightforward that 'even a theoretician might be able also to do it'. This intrigued Powell, and he convinced theoretician Heitler to travel to Switzerland with a batch of llford emulsions and expose them on the Jungfraujoch at 3500m. In a letter to 'Nature' in August 1939, Heitler and Powell were able to confirm the observations of Blau and Wambacher. Thus Heitler had some influence in setting Cecil Powell on the first step of his path to the 1950 Nobel Prize in Physics, "for his development of the photographic method of studying nuclear processes and his discoveries regarding mesons made with this method". 

After the fall of France in 1940, Heitler was briefly interned on the Isle of Man for several months.

Heitler remained at Bristol eight years, until 1941, when he became a professor at the Dublin Institute for Advanced Studies, which was arranged there by Erwin Schrödinger, Director of the School for Theoretical Physics. He has been described as the "unsung hero of DIAS in the 1940s".

At Dublin, Heitler's work with H. W. Peng on radiation damping theory and the meson scattering process resulted in the Heitler-Peng integral equation. During his stay in Dublin he lived at 21 Seapark Road, Clontarf, down the road from Erwin Schrödinger.

During the 1942–1943 academic year, Heitler gave a course on elementary wave mechanics, during which W. S. E. Hickson took notes and prepared a finished copy. These notes were the basis for Heitler's book Elementary Wave Mechanics: Introductory Course of Lectures, first published in 1943. A new edition was published as Elementary Wave Mechanics in 1945. This version was revised and republished many times, as well as being translated into French and Italian and published in 1949 and in German in 1961. A further revised version appeared as Elementary Wave Mechanics With Applications to Quantum Chemistry in 1956, as well as in German in 1961.

Schrödinger resigned as Director of the School for Theoretical Physics in 1946, but stayed at Dublin, whereupon Heitler became Director. Heitler stayed at Dublin until 1949, when he accepted a position as Ordinarius Professor for Theoretical Physics and Director of the Institute for Theoretical Physics at the University of Zurich, where he remained until 1974, when he retired.

In 1958, Heitler held the Lorentz Chair for Theoretical Physics at the University of Leiden.

While in Zurich, after some years, he began writing on the philosophical relationship of science to religion. His books were published in German, English, and French.

Quote
Physics eats chemistry with a spoon.

Honours
 1943 – Fellow of the Royal Irish Academy
 1948 – Fellow of the Royal Society of London
 1954 – Honorary Doctor of Science (DSc.) of the National University of Ireland
 1968 – Deutsche Physikalische Gesellschaft Max-Planck Medal
 1969 – Marcel Benoist Prize
 1979 – Gold Medal of the Humboldt Gesellschaft

Books

Physics
Walter Heitler Elementary Wave Mechanics: Introductory Course of Lectures Notes taken and prepared by W.S.E. Hickson (Oxford, 1943) 
Walter Heitler Elementary Wave Mechanics (Oxford, 1945, 1946, 1948, 1950) 
Walter Heitler The Quantum Theory of Radiation (Clarendon Press, 1936, 1944, 1947, 1949, 1950, 1953, 1954, 1957, 1960, 1966, 1970)
Reprinted by Dover Publications in 1984.
Walter Heitler 14 Offprints: 1928-1947 (1947)
Walter Heitler Eléments de Mécanique Ondulatoire (Presses Universitaires de France, PUF, Paris, 1949, 1964)
Walter Heitler Elementi di Meccanica Ondulatoria con presentazione di R.Ciusa (Zuffi, Bologna,1949)
Walter Heitler Elementary Wave Mechanics With Applications to Quantum Chemistry (Oxford University, 1956, 1958, 1961, 1969) 
Walter Heitler The Quantum Theory of Radiation [Russian Translation] (Moscow, 1956)
Walter Heitler Lectures on Problems Connected with the Finite Size of Elementary Particles (Tata Institute of Fundamental Research. Lectures on mathematics and physics. Physics) (Tata Institute of Fundamental Research, 1961)
Walter Heitler and Klaus Müller Elementare Wellenmechanik (Vieweg, 1961) 
Walter Heitler Elementare Wellenmechanik. Mit Anwendung auf die Quantenchemie (Vieweg Friedr. & Sohn Ver, 1961)
 Walter Heitler Wahrheit und Richtigkeit in den exakten Wissenschaften. Abhandlungen der mathematisch- naturwissenschaftlichen Klasse. Jahrgang 1972. Nr. 3. (Akademie der Wissenschaften und der Literatur. Mainz, Verlag der Akademie der Wissenschaften und der Literatur, Kommission bei Franz Steiner Verlag, Wiesbaden, 1972)
Walter Heitler Über die Komplementarität von lebloser und lebender Materie. Abhandlungen der Mathematisch-Naturwissenschaftlichen Klasse, Jahrg. 1976, Nr. 1 (Mainz, Verlag der Akademie der Wissenschaften und der Literatur, Kommission bei F. Steiner, 1976)

Science and religion
Walter Heitler Der Mensch und die naturwissenschaftliche Erkenntnis  (Vieweg Friedr. & Sohn Ver, 1961, 1962, 1964, 1966, 1984)
Walter Heitler Man and Science (Oliver and Boyd, 1963)
Walter Heitler Die Frage nach dem Sinn der Evolution (Herder, 1969)
Walter Heitler Naturphilosophische Streifzüge  (Vieweg Friedr. & Sohn Ver, 1970, 1984) 
Walter Heitler Naturwissenschaft ist Geisteswissenschaft (Zürich : Verl. die Waage, 1972)
K. Rahner, H.R. Schlette, B. Welte, R. Affemann, D. Savramis, W. Heitler Gott in dieser Zeit  (C. H. Beck, 1972)
Walter Heitler Die Natur und das Göttliche (Klett & Balmer; 1. Aufl edition, 1974)
Walter Heitler Gottesbeweise? Und weitere Vorträge (1977)
Walter Heitler La Nature et Le Divin (A la Baconniere, 1977)
Walter Heitler Schöpfung, die Öffnung der Naturwissenschaft zum Göttlichen (Verlag der Arche, 1979)
Walter Heitler Schöpfung als Gottesbeweis. Die Öffnung der Naturwissenschaft zum Göttlichen  (1979)

References

Bibliography
Key Participants: Walter Heitler – Linus Pauling and the Nature of the Chemical Bond: A Documentary History
Interview with Walter Heitler by John Heilbron (18 March 1963. Archives for the History of Quantum Physics)
L. O'Raifeartaigh and G. Rasche: Walter Heitler 1904–81, in  Creators of Mathematics, The Irish Connection, ed. Ken Houston, University College Dublin Press, 2000.
Nancy Thorndike Greenspan, "The End of the Certain World: The Life and Science of Max Born" (Basic Books, 2005) .
Mehra, Jagdish, and Helmut Rechenberg The Historical Development of Quantum Theory. Volume 5 Erwin Schrödinger and the Rise of Wave Mechanics. Part 1 Schrödinger in Vienna and Zurich 1887–1925. (Springer, 2001) 
Jammer, Max The Conceptual Development of Quantum Mechanics (McGraw-Hill, 1966)
Moore, Walter Schrödinger: Life and Thought (Cambridge, 1992)

External links

1904 births
1981 deaths
Scientists from Göttingen
Fellows of the Royal Society
20th-century German physicists
Ludwig Maximilian University of Munich alumni
Jewish emigrants from Nazi Germany to the United Kingdom
Academics of the University of Bristol
Jewish physicists
Winners of the Max Planck Medal
Academics of the Dublin Institute for Advanced Studies